Mahan Rah (also Romanized as( Māhān Rāh) is a construction company in Iran. It has been in the business since 1983 with over 500 employees.

References 

Populated places in Pakdasht County